Reginald Heber Fitz (1843–1913) was an American physician known for his research on abdominal disorders.

Biography

Early life
Reginald Heber Fitz was born on May 5, 1843 in Chelsea, Massachusetts. He graduated in 1864 (M.D., 1868) from Harvard University. He also studied in Vienna, Berlin, and Paris.

Career
He taught at his alma mater, Harvard University. He was instructor in pathological anatomy in 1870–1873, assistant professor in 1873–1878, and professor from 1878 to 1908. In the latter year, he became professor emeritus.

In 1886, he published "Perforating Inflammation of the Vermiform Appendix; With Special Reference to Its Early Diagnosis and Treatment".  This groundbreaking paper provided analysis of 466 cases of abdominal disorders that had previously been variously diagnosed and showed that they all involved a diseased appendix.  He also introduced the term appendicitis. Dozens of names had previously been used for what had been thought to be a variety of diseases.

He also served as physician to the Boston Dispensary in 1871–1882 and to the Massachusetts General Hospital from 1887 to 1908. In 1894, he was president of the Association of American Physicians.

Personal life
Fitz married Elizabeth Loring Clarke in 1879, and they had three children.

He died in Brookline, Massachusetts on September 30, 1913, after having surgery to remove a gastric ulcer.

Bibliography
The Practice of Medicine (with Horatio C. Wood, 1897).

References

 

1843 births
1913 deaths
American science writers
Harvard Medical School alumni
Harvard Medical School faculty
Writers from Chelsea, Massachusetts
Physicians from Massachusetts
American expatriates in France
American expatriates in Germany